The Post of Manila was a US Army post, in Manila, (Luzon, the Philippines), at which several U.S. Army units were stationed. On 7 December 1941, these were  
 the Philippine Division's 31st Infantry Regiment  
 288th Signal Company (Operations)
 808th MP Company

See also
Geography of the Philippines
Military History of the Philippines
Military History of the United States

Notes 

Military history of the Philippines
History of Manila